Agra Metro is an under-construction rapid transit network in Agra, the fourth largest city in the Indian state of the Uttar Pradesh. The Detailed Project Report (DPR) was submitted in 2014 and cleared by the Uttar Pradesh government cabinet in 2015. However, due to the formation of a new government and a new Metro Rail Policy, a revised feasibility report was created with the government finally approving the project in early 2019.

History 
, DPR has been prepared by RITES and submitted to the state government.

On 28 February 2019, Union Cabinet approved the metro project in Agra worth  8379.62 crore.

December 2020: Prime Minister Narendra Modi inaugurated the Civil Construction work for Agra Metro Project.

Project highlights 
The cost of construction is estimated at 350 crore per km. The cost will be evaluated based on the June 2015 price index.

Agra Metro Rail Project will have 2 corridors that will pass through the heart of the city and will connect prominent tourist places including Taj Mahal, Agra Fort, and Sikandra as well as ISBT, Raja Ki Mandi railway station, Medical College, Agra Cantonment railway station, Collectorate, Sanjay Place, and surrounding densely populated residential areas.

Highlights of these corridors include:
 The length of Sikandra to Taj East Gate corridor 14.00 km, which is partly elevated and partly underground and comprises 13 stations (6-Elevated and 7-Underground).
 The length of Agra Cantt to Kalindi Vihar corridor is 15.40 km comprising 14 stations all elevated.
 The estimated cost of the project is 8,379.62 crore and the project will be completed in five years.

About 20 lakh population of the city is expected to be benefit by Agra Metro Rail Project directly and indirectly at the time of commencement of commercial operations.

The proposed corridors will be having Multimodal Integration with Railway Stations & BRTS Stations and will have a feeder network of Bus, Intermediate Public Transport (IPT), and Non-Motorized Transport (NMT). The Project will have non-fare box revenue from rental & advertisement as well as Value Capture Financing (VCF) through the mechanism of Transit-Oriented Development (TOD) and Transfer of Development Rights (TDR).

The Agra Metro is scheduled to start operating from December 2022.

Route network 
In Phase 1, 14 metro stations will be built on the first corridor (Line 1) from Sikandra to Taj East Gate and 15 metro stations will be built on the second corridor (Line 2) from Agra Cantt to Kalindi Vihar.

(Sikandra - Taj East Gate)
Length: 14.27  km

Alignment: Elevated (6.569 km) & Underground (7.681 km)

No. of Stations: 14

Stations:
 Sikandra
 Guru ka Taal
 ISBT 
 Shastri Nagar
 RBS College
 Raja Ki Mandi
 Agra College (Interchange)
 Medical College
 Mankameshwar Mandir
 Agra Fort
 Taj Mahal
 Fatehabad Road
 Basai
 Taj East Gate

(Agra Cantt - Kalindi Vihar)
Length: 15.40 km

Alignment: Elevated

No. of Stations: 16

Stations:
 Agra Cantt
 Sultanpura
 Sadar Bazar
 Pratap Pura
 Collectorate
 Subhash Park
 Agra College (Interchange)
 Hariparvat Chauraha
 Sanjay Place
 MG Road
 Sultanganj Crossing
 balkeshwar
 Rambagh
 Foundary Nagar
 Agra Mandi
 Kalindi Vihar

Rolling stock
In 2020, Bombardier Transportation won the contract to supply the rolling stock and the signalling system, and the project received conditional clearance from the Supreme Court.However the contract was cancelled and Alstom was chosen to supply the rolling stock for the Yellow line. The rolling stock resembles those that run on the Kanpur Metro. On March 6 2023, the first set of coaches arrived at the Taj Station of the Yellow line from Alstom's manufacturing facility at Savli in Gujarat

Status updates
 July 2016: Detailed Project Report submitted to the State Government.
 September 2017: The central government rejected the DPR of Agra Metro as it didn't conform with the new Metro Rail Policy 2017 introduced that month.
 January 2018: The UP Government Cabinet decides to build metros in Meerut, Kanpur, and Agra.
 September 2018: Detailed Project Report (DPR) sent by the UP Government to the Central Government.
7 February 2019: The UP Government has allocated  175 crore to start preliminary work in budget.
28 February 2019: Central Government approved the metro project in Agra.
 8 March 2019: Foundation stone laid down by Prime Minister Narendra Modi.
 August 2019: LMRC has requested relevant authorities to transfer land for Metro construction.
 January 2020: Construction work yet to start as few permissions from the Supreme Court of India, Taj Trapezium Zone Authority (TTZ), Forest department, Archaeological Survey of India and others other departments are pending. Once permissions are in place, land acquisition will take another 3 months.
15 June 2020: TYPSA - Italferr JV wins General Consultant contract
 July 2020: Bombardier Transportation won the Agra Metro and Kanpur Metro rolling stock and signalling contract. Agra Metro project gets conditional clearance from the Supreme Court. The project which was stuck due to the court stay will now progress fast.
 October 2020: Contract awarded for construction for three metro stations. Civil engineering work to start in December 2020.
 December 2020: Prime Minister Narendra Modi inaugurated the construction work at the Agra Metro Project Site on 7 December 2020.
April 2021: In Agra metro priority section, a total of 688 piles are to be constructed in the 3 km long portion on Fatehabad Road, in which 344 piles are ready, 10 pillars are built, and digging is continued for 3 metro stations.
May 2021: UP Metro has built 400 piles out of a total of 686 in the priority section of the Agra Metro project. With this, 45 pile-caps and 16 pillars are also ready. The work of a zero discharge facility at Agra Metro depot is also at a rapid pace. For the zero discharge facility, several underground tanks of different capacities will be built in the Agra Metro Depot complex. For zero discharge facility, a joint water treatment plant of 1 lakh liter capacity will be set up at Agra Metro Depot. In this water treatment plant, the gray water coming out from the kitchen, washroom, floor cleaning, will be recycled. For this, a plant with a capacity of 70,000 liters will be installed. Similarly, a 30,000 liters capacity plant will be set up to treat such black water by washing the coach and whatever other chemical-rich water will come out. Both the plants will be built in the same building so that they can be used in a better way.
June 2021: Construction of depot line for Agra Metro has begun with the commencement of piling work on the depot line with 13 piles already constructed so far.} The depot line will connect the mainline with the Metro Depot which is under construction at PAC Ground where metro trains will be stabled and maintained. For the depot line, a total of 500 piles, 39 pile capes, and 34 piers will be constructed.
June 2021: The casting of the concourse beam of Taj East Gate, the first metro station of Agra Metro, has also started. The piling work has already been completed with the construction of 69 piles of Taj East Gate Metro Station. Currently, the pillars are being constructed in the side grid of Taj East Gate Metro Station. Soon the construction of the concourse level will also start.
June 2021: Along with the construction of the Agra Metro Project Priority Section (Taj East Gate to Jama Masjid), UP Metro has also started the construction of the Depot Line. For this, along with starting the piling, the construction of 13 piles has also been completed. The covered train stabling yard, integrated workshop, and pit wheel length are being constructed in Agra Metro Depot with the new PEB (Pre Engineering Building) technique.
July 2021: European Investment Bank (EIB) to fund 480 mn euros for Agra Metro Rail Project.
Aug 2021: Unique codes of all metro stations in Agra Metro Rail Project get approved by Indian Railways, as of 7 August.
Aug 2021: European Investment Bank (EIB) approves and is ready to fund 480 mn euros for Agra Metro Rail Project, as of 10 August.
Aug 2021: Taj East Gate Metro Station takes shape, and it will be the first metro station of Agra Metro to be completed, as of 24 August.
Sep 2021: Construction begins of Agra Metro's second metro station, Basai Metro Station.
Oct 2021: Tenders invited for electrification contract for Agra Metro.
Dec 2021: Work on Agra Metro's third metro station, Fatehabad Metro Station, is expected to be completed by December-end.

See also 
 Urban rail transit in India
 Uttar Pradesh Metro Rail Corporation
 Lucknow Metro
 Kanpur Metro
 Noida Metro

References 

Proposed rapid transit in Uttar Pradesh
Transport in Agra
Standard gauge railways in India